Bangladesh Archery Federation is the national federation for archery and is responsible for governing the sport in Bangladesh. Lieutenant General Mohammad Mainul Islam is the President of the Bangladesh Archery Federation. Kazi Razib Uddin Ahmed is the General Secretary of the foundation.

History
Bangladesh Archery Federation was established in 2001. It became an affiliate of the World Archery Federation in 2003. In November 2019, the foundation received sponsorship from City Group.

References

Archery in Bangladesh
National members of the Asian Archery Federation
2001 establishments in Bangladesh
Sports organizations established in 2001
Archery
Organisations based in Dhaka